The Cholla Power Plant is a 1.02-gigawatt (1,021 MW), coal power plant near Joseph City, Arizona, United States. The plant is jointly owned by Arizona Public Service (APS) and PacifiCorp. The plant began operations in 1962.

History
The coal burned at the plant came mostly from the McKinley Mine, located east of Window Rock, Arizona in New Mexico, until the mine was closed in 2009 after its reserves being leased were exhausted. In 2010, the Environmental Protection Agency (EPA) notified Cholla that pollution controls were needed for Units 2 through 4. Unit 2 was retired in 2016 as the cost to add pollution controls outweighed the benefits. The remaining units were to be either retired or converted to burn another fuel source by 2025. In January 2020, it was announced that PacifiCorp would close unit 4 by the end of the year. APS announced that while a conversion to natural gas had been an option, it was no longer being considered. A proposal was put forth to convert a unit to burn biomass, however regulators at the Arizona Corporation Commission voted down that plan in 2019.

Units
The plant currently consists of the following units:

References

External links
 APS 
 Data on generation and fuel consumption from the Energy Information Administration Electricity Data Browser

Energy infrastructure completed in 1962
Energy infrastructure completed in 1978
Energy infrastructure completed in 1980
Energy infrastructure completed in 1981
Buildings and structures in Navajo County, Arizona
Coal-fired power stations in Arizona
PacifiCorp